The 2nd Massachusetts Volunteer Cavalry Regiment was a regiment of cavalry troops in the Union army during the American Civil War. It consisted primarily of men from the states of California and Massachusetts, and served in the Eastern Theater, despite its western roots.

History
Politicians at the start of the Civil War began raising volunteer troops in response to President Abraham Lincoln's call to arms to force the return of the Confederate States of America to the Union. Owing to political divisions at the time of the Civil War and to the limited transportation facilities for moving troops great distances, the Lincoln administration did not request California troops for Eastern battlefields but instead called for volunteers to replace regular troops stationed at western garrisons. In the late summer of 1862, a small number of men in California who had been raised in the East decided to enlist in the army, but wanted to serve in the Eastern Theater. They contacted Governor John Andrew of Massachusetts in the late summer of 1862 and offered to raise a company of 100 cavalrymen to serve in a state regiment. Andrews agreed on the condition the Californians would provide their own uniforms and equipment and pay for their own passage to Boston. 

The so-called "California Hundred" was organized in San Francisco on December 10, 1862, and took a ship to the East Coast, arriving at Camp Meigs in Readville, Massachusetts, on January 4, 1863. They were designated as Company A, and soon were joined by seven companies of Massachusetts. The Californians and four of the local companies were moved in mid-February to Baltimore, Maryland, then to Fort Monroe and numerous other locations in Virginia, where they primarily engaged in picketing, scouting, and outpost duty until July 1863. Commanded by James Sewall Reed, the Californians first took to the field near Yorktown, Virginia. From July 1863 to July 1864, the California Hundred engaged in numerous skirmishes with John S. Mosby's Confederate partisan rangers in the Loudoun Valley. 

In February and March 1863, another 400 Californians were recruited and sent to Massachusetts to form Companies E, F, L, and M (the "California Battalion") of the 2nd Massachusetts Cavalry. They arrived in the Bay State on April 16, 1863, completing the full complement of the regiment. They moved to Washington, D.C., in May and Colonel Charles Russell Lowell was given command.

In August 1863, the regiment was combined in Centreville, Virginia, and became a part of King's Division in the XXII Corps. They later served in the Army of the Shenandoah under Philip H. Sheridan during the Valley Campaigns of 1864. Among the many actions that the 2nd Massachusetts Cavalry participated in were the battles of Fort Stevens, Opequon, Tom's Brook, and Cedar Creek. The following spring in 1865, by now under command of Colonel Caspar Crowninshield, it participated in the Siege of Petersburg. In the subsequent Appomattox Campaign it pursued elements of the retreating Army of Northern Virginia, then marched in the Grand Review of the Armies in Washington on May 23. The men were mustered out July 20, 1865, at Fairfax Court House, Virginia, before returning to California and Massachusetts in the weeks that followed.

The regiment lost during its service 8 officers and 82 enlisted men killed and mortally wounded, and 3 officers and 138 enlisted men by disease for a total of 231. Of the original California Hundred's 3 officers and 101 enlisted men, 40 were present the day the company disbanded. About 12 had died, others were discharged because of sickness or wounds or were transferred to other units, and 10 deserted, a greater desertion rate than from any other Massachusetts regiment.

Two men of the regiment were awarded the Medal of Honor for gallantry in the Valley Campaigns of 1864. The two men were:
 Private Philip Baybutt at Luray, Virginia
 Captain Henry H. Crocker at the Battle of Cedar Creek

See also
List of Massachusetts Civil War Units
Massachusetts in the American Civil War

Notes

References
Bowen, James L. (1889) Massachusetts in the War 1861-65. Springfield, MA: Clark W Bryan & Co.
 Colwell, Wayne. "The California Hundred."  Pacific Historian  1969 13(3): 63–75. ISSN 0030-8676.
 Dyer, Frederick H., A Compendium of the War of the Rebellion. Vol. 2. Dayton, Ohio: Morningside Press, 1979.
2nd Regiment of Cavalry, Massachusetts Volunteers
The Second Mass and Its Fighting Californians
 Langellier, John Phillip and Colwell, Wayne. "Cavaliers from California" Gateway Heritage 1984-1985 5(3): 16–21. ISSN 0198-9375.

Rogers, Larry, and Keith Rogers. Their Horses Climbed Trees: A Chronicle of the California 100 and Battalion in the Civil War from San Francisco to Appomattox. Atglen, PA: Schiffer Pub., 2001. Print.

Units and formations of the Union Army from California
Units and formations of the Union Army from Massachusetts
1862 establishments in California
Cavalry regiments of the United States Army